Terence Geoffrey Thomas Taylour, 5th Marquess of Headfort (1 May 1902 – 24 October 1960) was an Anglo-Irish soldier and peer, a member of the House of Lords from 1943 until his death. He was known as Earl of Bective before that.

The son of Geoffrey Taylour, 4th Marquess of Headfort, and his wife Rosie Boote, he was educated at Harrow School and Magdalen College, Oxford.

Commissioned into the Warwickshire Yeomanry, he was aide-de-camp to the Governor of South Australia between 1939 and 1940, then between 1941 and 1942 was a Staff Captain with the Australian Military Forces. In 1943 he joined the War Office Military Secretary's Branch.

On 29 January 1943, he succeeded his father as Marquess of Headfort (I., 1800), Earl of Bective (I., 1766), Viscount Headfort (I., 1762), Baron Headfort  (I., 1760), and Baron Kenlis (U.K., 1831); he also became the eighth Taylor baronet (I., 1704).

He was awarded the Territorial Decoration.

On 18 September 1928, as Earl of Bective, 
he married Elise Florence Tucker, daughter of James Partridge Tucker and Marion Kinnear, and they had two children:
Lady Olivia Elsie June Taylour (1929–2009
Thomas Taylour, 6th Marquess of Headfort (1932–2005)

Notes

External links

 

1902 births
1960 deaths
Alumni of Magdalen College, Oxford
Terence
People educated at Harrow School
Marquesses of Headfort